Avalon Independent School District is a public school district based in the community of Avalon, Texas. The district operates one high school, Avalon High School.

Finances
As of the 2010–2011 school year, the appraised valuation of property in the district was $33,437,000. The maintenance tax rate was $0.117 and the bond tax rate was $0.007 per $100 of appraised valuation.

Academic achievement
In 2011, the school district was rated "recognized" by the Texas Education Agency.  Thirty-five percent of districts in Texas in 2011 received the same rating. No state accountability ratings will be given to districts in 2012. A school district in Texas can receive one of four possible rankings from the Texas Education Agency: Exemplary (the highest possible ranking), Recognized, Academically Acceptable, and Academically Unacceptable (the lowest possible ranking).

Historical district TEA accountability ratings
2011: Recognized
2010: Recognized
2009: Recognized
2008: Recognized
2007: Recognized
2006: Recognized
2005: Academically Acceptable
2004: Academically Acceptable

Schools
There is only one school in Avalon ISD, Avalon School, which serves students from Pre-K through twelfth grade.

See also

List of school districts in Texas
List of high schools in Texas

References

External links

School districts in Ellis County, Texas